Kongsberg Gruppen is an international technology group headquartered in Norway, that supplies high-technology systems to customers in the merchant marine, defence, aerospace, offshore oil and gas industries, and renewable and utilities industries.

In 2018, Kongsberg had revenues of NOK 14.381 billion, and 6,842 employees in more than 25 countries. The company is headquartered in Kongsberg.

It comprises three business areas:
 Kongsberg Maritime 
 Kongsberg Defence & Aerospace 
 Kongsberg Digital

Kongsberg is a continuation of Kongsberg Weapons Factory (Kongsberg Våpenfabrikk - KV) (1814-1987). After KV's restructuring in 1987, defence activities continued as the company Norsk Forsvarsteknologi (NFT). In 1995 the company changed its name to Kongsberg Gruppen.

Kongsberg was listed on the Oslo Stock Exchange in 1993 and is a public company. The Norwegian Ministry of Trade, Industry and Fisheries is the largest shareholder with a 50.001 percent interest.

Markets outside of Norway pose a growing and increasingly important part of business and represented approximately 80% of revenue in 2015.

History
The company's origin and background dates back to the early 1600s.

The discovery of silver in the mountains around Kongsberg in 1624 meant that the city became an important mineral resource for the Danish Norwegian kingdom. When the Danish-Norwegian union was dissolved about 200 years later there was a need to build up a strong defence that would contribute to independence and security for Norway.

There was a need for a domestic defence industry, and Kongsberg already had expertise after centuries of mining. On 20 March 1814 Poul Steenstrup founded Kongsberg Våpenfabrikk.

Beginning (1814–1890)

1814 was an important year for Norway. The nation wrote its constitution and the weapons factory was one of the nation's first industrial factories.

Kongsberg Silver Mines experienced a recession and as a consequence Kongsberg suffered distress and poverty. There was a need to create new jobs. In addition Norway was marked by the desire for national independence, and the Weapons factory would make the newly established state self-supplied with weapons.

Kongsberg's mining traditions - established over several centuries - provided a good basis for building a knowledge-based business. Skilled mining engineers were now assigned to develop the new company.

The Weapons Factory quickly began producing rifles for the Norwegian Armed Forces. A number of models were developed and delivered throughout the 19th century. The major international breakthrough came in 1888 when director Ole Herman Johannes Krag and corps gunsmith Erik Jørgensen showcased a new type of rifle.

International breakthrough (1890–1900)

International breakthrough came with the Krag–Jørgensen rifle in 1892.

The officer Ole Herman Johannes Krag and gunsmith Erik Jørgensen wanted to produce a new type of precision rifle, which was both easy to use, inexpensive to manufacture and which had revolutionary functionality. The rifle's mechanism proved to be something quite revolutionary in the arms industry.

The Krag–Jørgensen rifle was first adopted as a service rifle by the Danish Army in 1889. Three years later the rifle became a world-known concept when the United States decided to equip their soldiers with the rifle. "The Krag" turned out to be one of the first major export contracts for the Norwegian industry. During a six-year period the U.S. alone produced well over half a million rifles on licence.

In 1894 the weapon was adopted as army rifle for the Norwegian Army. The weapon was in service until World War II.

"The Krag" became Norway's first large-scale industrial export and helped to establish an important relationship with the U.S. military.

Modernization (1900–1945)

The Krag–Jørgensen rifle dominated production at Kongsberg until the end of World War I. When the war was over there was a significant decline in military orders. The company therefore used its position and expertise from the defence industry to enter new markets and seek new business opportunities.

Production of civilian products such as civil weapons, tools, and parts for the shipping industry and whaling fleet began 1918. Other departments made bicycle components, while the cannon department made shafts, connecting rods, forgings and whale guns.

Kongsberg launched its first civil products in 1921. The products won gold medal at the World Exposition in Barcelona in 1929.

During World War II Kongsberg was under German control. Production, however, never came up to such numbers as the occupation forces wanted. This was partly due to access to raw materials, but also resistance among factory workers.

Industrial locomotive (1945–1960)
After the war, Kongsberg was designated as one of the major industrial builders in Norway. The company produced everyday necessities such as pots and pans, and contributed to the development of the defence and maritime industry.

The weapons factory was no longer under military command, and in 1953, the Norwegian Parliament, adopted a large-scale modernization and expansion of the company. The aim was to build a national high-tech defence industry that met the needs of the Norwegian Armed Forces as well as those of NATO.

The creation of the Forsvarets Forskningsinstitutt ("Defence Research Establishment") (FFI) at Kjeller in 1947 was part of the same strategy.

This cooperation was from the 1950s and up till present given rise to a number of defence systems such as the Penguin missile, NASAMS 2 air defence system, HUGIN AUV and Naval Strike Missile.

After an agreement with Volvo in 1957, the production of automobile parts also became a considerable business for KONGSBERG. At first the company produced drive shafts, and then other components for heavy trucks, buses, tractors and agricultural machinery. The division was later reorganized into the company Kongsberg Automotive.

Innovative breakthrough (1960–1987)
Having had a national focus in the post-war period, KONGSBERG again directed its attention and expertise towards the international market. The years from 1960 to the end of the 80s were a time of innovation, development and rapid growth for Kongsberg.

KONGSBERG's focus on the maritime industry began in the early 1970s and coincided with the discovery of oil in the North Sea. Companies that would later become part of Kongsberg Gruppen, such as Simrad and Norcontrol, however, had already provided sonar systems and equipment for fishing and merchant marine for decades.

The 1970s also became the decade when KONGSBERG positioned itself towards the petroleum sector. Dynamic positioning (DP) and subsea installations were revolutionary technology, which gave KONGSBERG a technological edge. KONGSBERG was about to get a position as a global technology leader.

International breakthroughs (1960–1987)
 The production of gas turbines in 1969
 Submarine systems in 1969-1970
 Subsea and dynamic positioning (DP) in the early 1970s
 Pioneering missile technology and the Penguin missiles in 1972

The rapid international growth resulted in both new opportunities and challenges. The new focus on establishing a civilian product portfolio changed the shape of the company. In 1981 civil divisions accounted for 70% of business.

Companies were acquired and the number of employees increased sharply. An international network of offices and factories began to take shape. But the business advancement and progress coincided with national and international unrest, which had a serious impact on the company, as an outcome of so-called Toshiba-Kongsberg scandal, after illegal export to the Soviet Union machine tools banned by Cocom. The outcome was a need to restructure the entire company.

Reappearance (1987–1993)
In 1987, the company was part of the Toshiba-Kongsberg scandal, which involved a subsidiary of Toshiba and the Kongsberg Vaapenfabrikk. The two provided the Soviet Union with technology (Toshiba milling machines and Kongsberg computer numerical controls) that could be used to produce quiet submarine propellers, in violation of the CoCom agreement.  The US always relied on the fact that the Soviets had noisy boats. Providing the Soviet Union with technology that could make their subs harder to find and track was perceived as a significant threat to the  security of the United States.

1987 was a turning point in the history of Kongsberg. The company was divided into divisions that manufactured automobile parts, aircraft parts, gas turbines, oil installations, and marine equipment and defence equipment. Innovation was high, but not the profitability. The company had taken on too large and complex development tasks.

The state, which owned all the shares, would not inject big money to keep the whole business, so the company was split up. The civil division was sold out, while the defence division continued under the name Norwegian Defence Technology (NFT) from 19 June 1987 to 1995.

The newly formed company had for a short period of time a renewed focus on its core defence business. This helped the company regain financial stability. Then Kongsberg again turned its focus towards civil and maritime sectors.

Kongsberg also entered new markets. In 1990 the company launched its own aerospace division.

The restructuring process that began in 1987 culminated in 1993 when it was decided that Kongsberg should be partially privatized and listed on the Oslo Stock Exchange. This gave Kongsberg greater independence and the opportunity to cooperate with private business investors. It helped facilitate many positive changes, such as the establishment of Kongsberg Maritime as a separate business unit. The decision proved to be a crucial building block in the creation of Kongsberg as a modern company.

International growth (1993–2015)
In 1993, the company Norwegian Defence Technology (NFT) became publicly listed and partially privatized. Two years later, in 1995, the company took the name Kongsberg Gruppen and the current logo was established.

Then followed a long series of acquisitions. This included buying back the maritime division.

In 1997, Kongsberg gathered its operations in the subsidiaries Kongsberg Maritime and Kongsberg Defence & Aerospace.

In 2008, parts of the defence business spun off as a separate business area as "Kongsberg Protech Systems". Other defence activities continued under the name Kongsberg Defence Systems.

Also in 2008, parts of Kongsberg Maritime, which had worked with simulation technology in oil and gas, were reorganized under new management. The result was Kongsberg Oil & Gas Technologies that was established as a separate business area. However, due to challenging market conditions in the oil and gas industry this area was consolidated into Kongsberg Maritime and the newly established business area Kongsberg Digital in 2016.

By the end of 2009 Kongsberg was divided into four separate divisions/business areas.

As of October 2017 the business area Kongsberg Protech Systems was merged into Kongsberg Defence & Aerospace.

Significant company developments (1993–2014)
 The development of the prototype of HUGIN which was demonstrated for Statoil in 1996, later further developed to MUNIN. REMUS is another Autonomous Underwater Vehicle, produced at Hydroid, a fully owned subsidiary of Kongsberg.
 The development of the weapons station Protector RWS from 1997
 1998: the Air Defence System Norwegian Advanced Surface-to-Air Missile System (NASAMS) was pronounced operational.
 The development of the Naval Strike Missile and the Joint Strike Missile.
 The co-development of Well Advisor together with BP
 In 2014, Kongsberg celebrated its 200th anniversary.

Business

The Kongsberg Group has three  business areas: Kongsberg Maritime, Kongsberg Defence & Aerospace and Kongsberg Digital.
 Kongsberg Maritime delivers products and systems for positioning, navigation and automation to merchant vessels and offshore installations, as well as products and systems for seabed surveying and monitoring.
 Kongsberg Defence & Aerospace focuses on command and control systems, weapons control systems, communication systems, missiles, advanced composites and surveillance.
 Kongsberg Digital provides technology, products and services relating to monitoring, integration, analysis, simulation, quality assurance and governance for the oil and gas industry, maritime simulation and the renewables and utilities industry.

Defence

Kongsberg has a long history of collaborating with national and international defence industries.

The business area Kongsberg Defence & Aerospace is a provider of command and control systems, weapons control, communications, missiles, advanced composites and surveillance.

A major milestone for the Group's defence area came in 2007 when the Group won a contract worth eight billion kroner for the delivery of CROWS II – a type of Protector Remote Weapon Stations (RWS) - to the U.S. military.

The RWS allows the operator to control the weapon inside the vehicle, providing increased protection and reduced risk of both military personnel and civilians. As of today, the Protector RWS claims to be the world's leading provider of remote weapon stations. Kongsberg has since delivered more than 17,000 weapons systems to 16 countries worldwide.

Kongsberg's largest single contract ever was signed in January 2014 with Oman on the air defence system NASAMS.

In September 2019, Kongsberg unveiled the Vanguard-class multirole warship, designed in collaboration with Salt Ships.

Notable defence area products
 Penguin
 Naval Strike Missile (NSM)
 Joint Strike Missile (JSM)
 NASAMS 2
 Protector Remote Weapon Station (RWS) - with Thales
 CROWS II – variant of Protector system
 Vanguard-class multirole warship

Space
Kongsberg has for several years increased its activities in space and surveillance. KONGSBERG's space activities are organized under Kongsberg Defence Systems.

In 1990, Kongsberg launched its own aerospace business unit. Through its subsidiaries Kongsberg Satellite Services (KSAT) and Kongsberg Spacetec in Tromsø the company is now a leader in services related to ground stations and satellites. Kongsberg currently operates a worldwide network of ground stations including on Svalbard and Antarctica, used by e.g. NASA and the European Space Agency (ESA). The acquisition of Horten-based Norspace AS 2011 consolidated space operations in Norway and contributed to KONGSBERG's commercial position within international aerospace and surveillance was strengthened.

Kongsberg's space division is Norway's largest supplier of equipment and services to the European Space Agency (ESA).

Kongsberg's Space & Surveillance division delivers a broad spectrum of equipment; systems and services related to space and maritime surveillance customers in more than 40 countries. The portfolio includes equipment and components for the European heavy-lift launcher Ariane 5, communication satellites, earth observation satellites and scientific space probes. The division is a supplier of satellite ground stations for downloading and processing satellite data, as well as a supplier of satellite services from ground stations at Svalbard in the Arctic, the Antarctic and numerous other locations.

The division is also a provider of maritime domain awareness systems and control centers for maritime surveillance, where integration of terrestrial and satellite data constitutes an important component.

Kongsberg's Space & Surveillance division is located in Kongsberg, Kjeller, Horten and Tromsø.

Maritime
Kongsberg's focus on maritime industries began in the early 1970s and coincided with the discovery of oil in the North Sea. This was also the decade in which Kongsberg positioned itself in the petroleum sector. Dynamic positioning (DP) and underwater installations were two areas that would prove to be crucial for the company.

On 17 May 1977 Kongsberg's first DP-system was put into operation on board the diving support vessel Seaway Eagle. In 1983, KONGSBERG introduced the first diver-free underwater system for the Gullfaks field. It went on to operate for 20 years.

Kongsberg Maritime
Kongsberg Maritime is Kongsberg's largest business area. It is divided in three main areas:
 Offshore
 Subsea & Fishery 
 Merchant Marine

Kongsberg Maritime delivers products and systems for positioning, navigation and automation to merchant vessels, Subsea and offshore installations, as well as products and systems for seabed surveying and monitoring. The company is a world leader in dynamic positioning (DP), automation and monitoring systems, process automation, satellite navigation and hydro-acoustics

Kongsberg Maritime's activities have in recent years grown steadily. The company's supplies to the subsea, offshore and merchant fleet amounted in 2013 to over half of the Kongsberg Group's total revenue.

In 2019, the company unveiled its proposed Vanguard-class multirole warship, based loosely on commercial support ships.

Notable Kongsberg Maritime products
 Dynamic positioning 
 Subsea installations
 Kongsberg Maritime Simulation 
 HUGIN 
 Seaglider
 REMUS
 MUNIN

The business area is headquartered in Kongsberg, has greater activity in the maritime cluster in Horten, in addition to offices worldwide.

Digital
Kongsberg Digital was established in 2016 to increase to group's focus and efforts on industrial digitalization. It was fully operational from 1 July 2016. The business area consists of simulation from the previous business area of Kongsberg Oil & Gas Technologies and simulation from Kongsberg Maritime. In addition the business area has established positions within the renewable and utilities area. The business area is headquartered in Asker, with offices throughout Norway and the world.

Notable Kongsberg Digital products
 EmPower
 K-Sim
 K-Spice
 Kognifai
 LedaFlow®
 Rig Manager®
 SiteCom®
 Kognitwin

Corporate management

Kongsberg's executives
 Poul Steenstrup, Manager 1814–1824 
 Captain Fredrik Meyn, Manager/Vice President 1824–1842
 Staff Captain Peder Christian Holst, Vice President 1842–1854
 Captain Jens Landmark, Vice President 1854-1880 (constituted 1854–1855)
 Captain Ole Herman Johannes Krag, Vice President 1880–1895
 Captain Jacob Maximillian Gran Paaske, Vice President 1895–1912
 Captain Johan Jørgen Schwartz, Vice President 1912–1926
 Captain Haakon Finne, Vice President 1926–1940
 Department engineer Thomas Mørk, Temporary Manager 1940–1945
 Captain Haakon Finne, 1945–1946 
 Major Alstad, acting Vice President 1945–1948
 Dr. scient. Leif Lyche, Vice President 1948–1956
 Major Bjarne Hurlen, Chief Executive Officer (CEO) 1956–1975
 Arthur J. Aasland, 1975-1978
 Rolf Qvenild, Chief Executive Officer (CEO) 1978–1987
 Tor Espedal, 1987
 Jens Charles Width, 1987–1988
 Jan T Jørgensen, Chief Executive Officer (CEO) 1987–1999 
 Jan Erik Korssjøen, Chief Executive Officer (CEO) 1999–2008 
 Walter Qvam, Chief Executive Officer (CEO) 2008–2016
 Geir Håøy, Chief Executive Officer (CEO) 2016–

Results

Figures are in billions.

Corruption charges
In 2014 the company and Kongsberg Defence Systems were charged by Norway, for corruption related to deliveries (worth around Norwegian kroner 1.5 billion) of communication equipment to Romania during 1999–2008. The alleged corruption supposedly occurred in Kongsberg Defence & Aerospace, according to Aftenposten.

In spring 2012 "various signals" indicated corrupt practices, and within a short time, investigators from outside the company were put to task. In autumn of 2013 the company discontinued a year-long investigation by PricewaterhouseCoopers—without giving the investigators' report to the police. The investigation found that funds had been transferred to tax havens.

On 25 February 2014 Økokrim searched company premises in Kongsberg and Asker. On the same day one employee was arrested and charged (and released two days later). The leaders of the company were summoned for a meeting with then Minister of Trade and Industry. On 26 February 2014 the meeting was held, attended by then chairman and then CEO. The board meeting later that day, was joined by the minister via phone.

On 27 February 2014 media said that then chairman had not read the report by PricewaterhouseCoopers about their investigation.

A 28 February 2014 NRK article said that the transaction with Romania was connected with export guarantees worth Norwegian kroner 669 million—from Guarantee Institute for Export Credits (GIEK). Furthermore, "while we [NRK] were at the National Archives to find the documents, representatives from GIEK came to get the folders, supposedly because Økokrim has requested delivery of the documents—from GIEK". (The folders contained "three of the contracts" [with Romania].) The contracts with GIEK, stipulate that bribes and other corruption are in violation of the contracts.

Reactions to the investigation include professor Peter Gottschalk saying that "It is obvious that the company should have contacted the police and not discontinued the case. When financial crime is suspected, the police should be notified. I think that the reason they did not do that, was that they did not want publicity". A 28 February 2014 Dagens Næringsliv article said that "The question for the company's largest owner thru minister of trade Monica Mæland (H)—without regard to what Økokrim uncovers in its investigation—ought to be whether the government's companies are best served by having committee members that are that irresolute". A 5 March 2014 Aftenposten editorial said that "The most important question is another one: Why do such cases appear again and again, despite tightened regulations and attitude campaigns? - Is it time to move focus to the manner in which co-workers are rewarded?" An 18 March Dagens Næringsliv editorial said that "The board of directors of Kongsberg Gruppen permitted the [corporation's] leadership to put out of sight—the fact finding report regarding possible corruption—without bothering the leadership with bothersome questions. - The minister of trade must evaluate if this is in line with the zero tolerance, that she is trying to 'make more clear'."

In August 2016 the case against KONSGBERG was dropped by Økokrim, thus the company no longer being under suspicion or investigation for corruption. Økokrim decided to prosecute a former employee of the company with charges of fraud.

Cultural sponsoring and controversy
The Kongsberg Group is a main sponsors of the Kongsberg Jazz Festival.
In 2018 Andreas Røysum started an online petition on iPetitions demanding the festival organizers to end their cooperation with the Kongsberg Group stating the sponsoring being incompatible with the spirit of the festival.

See also
Kongsberg Mesotech
CROWS
Kongsberg Colt
List of oldest companies
M1 Abrams TUSK Kit (M1 Abrams tank with Kongsberg Gruppen remote-control MG turret)

References

 
Companies established in 1814
Holding companies of Norway
Manufacturing companies of Norway
Defence companies of Norway
Formerly government-owned companies of Norway
Companies based in Buskerud
Kongsberg
Companies listed on the Oslo Stock Exchange
Norwegian brands
Norwegian companies established in 1814
Manufacturing companies established in 1814